MS Viking Cinderella is a cruiseferry built in 1989 at Wärtsilä Marine Perno Shipyard in Turku, Finland, as MS Cinderella for SF Line, one of the owners of the Viking Line consortium. She's currently used on cruise traffic from Stockholm to Mariehamn and occasionally Riga during the summer.

History

The Cinderella was planned in the later half of the 1980s as the new flagship for SF Line. Her interior layout was based on that of MS Mariella but with more space and additional facilities. SF Line originally planned the Cinderella to take over the Mariellas place in Helsinki–Stockholm traffic (the Mariella would have been placed on a new route from Helsinki to Norrköping). The plan was never realised however, and when completed the Cinderella was placed as a third ship on the Helsinki–Stockholm route, with departures from Helsinki on Monday, Wednesday and Friday (at 19:30 instead of the normal 18:00), with a 25-hour (later 24-hour) cruise from Helsinki on Sundays. The one-day cruises proved very popular and after a few years they were made also on Fridays and Saturdays. 
In 1993, after the other Viking Line partner Rederi AB Slite went bankrupt, the Cinderella took over MS Olympia's place on the Helsinki–Stockholm route, sailing in tandem with the Mariella. At this time her passenger capacity was upgraded to 2,700, but it was soon lowered back to 2500. In autumn 1994 she swapped routes with MS Isabella, returning to making 24 (later 20) hour cruises from Helsinki to Tallinn. In summers 1995 and 1996 Cinderella sailed on the Turku–Mariehamn–Stockholm route, freeing MS Rosella for the seasonal Naantali–Mariehamn–Kapellskär route. In summers 2002 and 2003 Cinderella made cruises from Helsinki to Riga in addition to the normal 20 hour Tallinn cruises.

Viking Line decided to withdraw Cinderella from the Helsinki–Tallinn route after the end of the 2003 summer seasons, due to increased competition from Tallink's newer MS Romantika and the fact that tax-free sales on the route would end in 2004 when Estonia joined the EU. Cinderella was extensively rebuilt in Naantali, and emerged as the all-white Swedish-flagged Viking Cinderella for the Stockholm–Mariehamn 22-hour cruise market. The name change was dictated by necessity as a ship called Cinderella already existed in the Swedish ship registry. In 2003 the Viking Cinderella was declared the most environmentally friendly ship of her size in the world by the Swedish maritime authorities. From 2004 onwards Viking Cinderella made cruises to Riga (via Mariehamn in order to sell tax-free goods) during the summer season in addition to the 22-hour cruises. Viking Cinderella was the ship used in Sweden's Kanal 5 reality show Färjan.

MS Viking Cinderella is the only ship left in the Viking Line fleet to sail under Swedish flag after MS Rosella and MS Viking XPRS were reflagged to Finland and Estonia in January 2014.

See also
Largest ferries of Europe

References

External links

 Viking Line official website for M/S Viking Cinderella

Ferries of Finland
Ferries of Sweden
Cruiseferries
Ships built in Turku
1989 ships